Kelkan is a village located in the Kurdistan region in northern Iraq, adjacent to Dukan Lake and close to the city of Sulaymaniyah.

Notable people
The former Iraqi president Jalal Talabani was born in Kelkan in 1933.

References

Populated places in Sulaymaniyah Province